Ricardo Tacuchian, born in Rio de Janeiro (born 18 November 1939), is a Brazilian conductor, composer and Doctor in Musical Arts (Composition) at the University of Southern California.

His compositions have been performed in Europe and America and his discography is available in CD and LP format. In addition to article publications and textbook contributions, Tacuchian also lectures in Brazil and abroad.

Positions he has held include Titular Professor of both UFRJ and UNIRIO (where he was the Titular Conductor of the Unirio Orchestra), visiting professor of the State University of New York at Albany and of the Universidade Nova de Lisboa. He received grants and scholarship from Capes, CNPq (Brazil), Other Minds, Fulbright Commission, Rockefeller Foundation (USA), and Appolon Stiftung (Germany), among others. He is a lifetime member of the Brazilian Music Academy, the highest honoring musical institution in Brazil.

Partial List of Works

5 Cantatas
O Canto do Poeta (1969): Cecília Meireles; soprano, violin, flute, and piano. RJ, 1970.
Cantata dos Mortos (1965): Vinicius de Moraes; baritone, narrator, mixed choir, oboe, bassoon, piano, timpani, and percussion [Sistrum, 1981]. Ouro Preto, 1978.
Cantata de Natal (1978): Holy Bible, Carlos Drummond de Andrade, Manuel Bandeira, and Folk *Christmas Cycle of the State of Rio de Janeiro; Soprano, Baritone, 	Narrator, Mixed Choir, and Symphony Orchestra. Rio de Janeiro, 1978.
Ciclo Lorca (1979): Carlos Drummond de Andrade, Alphonsus de Guimarães Filho, and Murilo Mendes; baritone, clarinet, and String Orchestra. Rio de Janeiro, 1981.

Solo pieces for piano, guitar, flute, clarinet, harp, xylophone
Primeira Sonata para Piano (1966). Rio de Janeiro, 1975.
Segunda Sonata para Piano (1966). Rio de Janeiro, 1966.
Ritos (1977): harp. Rio de Janeiro, 1977.
Estruturas Gêmeas (1978): four-hand piano. Brasília, 1978.
Ludica I (1981): guitar [Max Eschig, 1981]. Toronto, Canada, 1981.
Ludica II (1984): guitar. Rio de Janeiro, 1985.
Profiles (1988): guitar. Los Angeles, 1989.
Rio de Janeiro’s Series (1996): 6 pieces for Guitar. Rio de Janeiro, 1996.
Capoeira (1997): piano. New York, 1997
Avenida Paulista (1999): piano. Gent, Belgium, 1999.
Alecrim (2001): for trumpet.
Aquarela  (2002): for left-hand piano
Leblon à Tarde (2003). Santos, 2003.
Lamento pelas Criançãs que choram (2003). Albany and NYC, 2003.
Manjericão (2003). Lisboa, 2004

About 25 Pieces for two, three, four and five instruments
Quarteto de Cordas nº 1 "Juvenil" (1963). Rio de Janeiro, 1964.
Quinteto de Sopros (1969): flute, oboe, clarinet, horn, and bassoon. Rio de Janeiro, 1975.
Estruturas Simbólicas (1973): clarinet, trumpet, percussion, piano and viola. RJ, 1974
Estruturas Obstinadas (1974): trumpet, horn, and trombone. Petrópolis, 1977.
Estruturas Verdes (1976): Violin, violoncello, and piano. Rio de Janeiro, 1977.
Estruturas Divergentes (1977): flute, oboe, and piano. Belo Horizonte, 1978.
Cárceres (1979): percussion ensemble for 4 musicians. Buffalo, NY, 1980.
Quarteto de Cordas nº 2 "Brasília" (1979). São Paulo, 1983.
Texturas (1987): two harps. Vienna, Austria, 1987.
Transparências (1987): Vibraphone and piano. Rio de Janeiro, 1987.
Delaware Park Suite (1988): saxophone alto and piano. Los Angeles, 1989.
Light and Shadows (1989): vibes, percussion, harp, bass clarinet, and double bass. Los Angeles, 1989.
Omaggio a Mignone (1997)  wind quintet and piano. Rio de Janeiro, 1997.
Evocação a Lorenzo Fernandez (1997): guitar and flute. Rio de Janeiro, 1997.
Quarteto de Cordas nº 3 "Bellagio" (2000). Milan, 2000.
Natureza Morta (2000): Flute, Clarinet, Violin, and Cello.
Quarteto Informal (2004): Flute, trombone, piano, bass guitar.
Xilogravura (2004): Viola and Piano

Bigger Ensembles
Estruturas Sincréticas (1970): piccolo, clarinet, bass clarinet, 2 horns, 2 trumpets, trombone, 4 timpani, 4 groups of percussion. Rio de Janeiro, 1972.
Estruturas Primitivas (1975): flute, oboe, horn, piano, viola, and cello. RJ, 1975
Rio/L.A. (1988): Engl. horn, brass quartet, marimba, perc. (1), piano, and electric bass guitar. LA, 1989.
Giga Byte (1994): 14 winds and piano obbligato. Rio de Janeiro, 1994.
Toccata Urbana (1999): Woodwind quartet, piano, and string quintet. New York, 2000.

Seven Pieces for String Orchestra with and without soloists
Concertino para Flauta e Orquestra de Cordas (1968).  Rio de Janeiro, 1973.
Concertino para Piano e Orquestra de Cordas (1977): [Sistrum, 1981]. RJ, 1978
Sinfonieta para Fátima (1986): String Orchestra. Rio de Janeiro, 1986.

Pieces for Symphonic Orchestra
Dia de Chuva (1963). Rio de Janeiro, 1964.
Imagem Carioca (1967). Rio de Janeiro, 1969.
Estruturas Sinfônicas (1976). Rio de Janeiro, 1978.
Núcleos (1983). Rio de Janeiro, 1983.
Hayastan (1990). São Paulo, 1993.
Terra Aberta (1997): The Bible and D. Pedro Casaldáliga; soprano and symphonic orchestra. Rio de Janeiro, 1997.
Toccata Sinfônica (2001). São Paulo, 2002

Computer Music
Prisma (1989). Los Angeles, 1989.

There are also 7 Cycles of Songs, some single songs for voice and piano and about 30 a cappella choir pieces

Some CDs with Tacuchian's music
Estruturas/Structures, Tacuchian Anos 70/ Tacuchian in the 1970s  (RioArte Digital)
Imagem Carioca: Música para Violão de R. Tacuchian  (ABM Digital). Tacuchian’s guitar music
Carnaval/Carnival. Music from Brazil and the U.S.  (North/South Recordings)
Toccarta Urbana. The North/South Chamber Orchestra (Max Lifchitz, conductor).
Mélange  (North/South Recordings)
Cono Sur . Richard Albagli, xylophone
Transparências. Richard Albagli, vibraphone; Max Lifchitz, piano
Tacuchian Piano Music  (ABM Digital)

References

1939 births

Living people
20th-century composers
20th-century conductors (music)
21st-century conductors (music)
Brazilian composers
Brazilian conductors (music)
Federal University of Rio de Janeiro alumni
USC Thornton School of Music alumni